Deckers is a surname mostly found in northwestern Europe. Notable people with the surname include:

Daphne Deckers (born 1968), Dutch model
Eugene Deckers (1917–1977), French actor
Frans Deckers (1835–1916), Belgian sculptor
Jan Deckers, philosopher, animal rights advocate
Jeanine Deckers (1933–1985), Belgian singer-songwriter known as "The Singing Nun"

See also
Decker (surname)
Dekkers (surname)